Karl Koller (9 February 1929 – 24 January 2009) was an Austrian football player.

Club career
Koller played most of his career for First Vienna FC (1949–1966). He is regarded, behind Ernst Ocwirk and Gerhard Hanappi, as one of the best Austrian midfielders of all time and was rated as one of the best 100 European footballers of the 20th century by the IFFHS. Normally a center midfielder, Koller was capable in both in defense and attack and was well known for technique, strength and powerful shot from distance.

International career
He made his debut for Austria in a March 1952 friendly match against Belgium and was a participant at the 1954 FIFA World Cup in Switzerland, where they reached 3rd place and 1958 FIFA World Cup, where he scored a goal in a match against England.

He earned 86 caps, scoring 5 goals, which still makes him Austria's fourth most capped player of all time. His last international was a September 1965 World Cup qualification match against  Hungary.

He went on to coach 1. Wiener Neustädter SC.

Honours

Club
Austrian Football Bundesliga (1):
 1955
Austrian Cup (1):
 1961

International
FIFA World Cup Third Place: 
 1954

References

External links
 Austria Wien archive 
 

1929 births
2009 deaths
Austrian footballers
Austria international footballers
1954 FIFA World Cup players
1958 FIFA World Cup players
First Vienna FC players
Austrian Football Bundesliga players
Austrian football managers
First Vienna FC managers
Association football midfielders